Cable Airport  is a non-towered public-use airport located two miles (3 km) northwest of the central business district of Upland, a city in San Bernardino County, California, United States. It is privately owned by the Cable Land Company.

History
Cable-Claremont Airport (as it was known until 1961) was founded in 1945 by Maude and Dewey Cable, who bought the land for $8,500. The Cables divided the land, selling the northern portion for what the entire parcel had cost them. That parcel was developed into a quarry by Holliday Rock, which recently erected its national headquarters near the approach end of Runway 24. It ran north–south, perpendicular to the prevailing winds, and had a steep gradient. The main runway, 6-24, was completed six months later.

Cable Commuter Airlines was a commuter air carrier operating de Havilland Canada DHC-6 Twin Otter STOL capable turboprop aircraft that was initially based at the airport.  In 1968, Cable Commuter Airlines was operating a hub at the Los Angeles International Airport (LAX) with flights to such southern California destinations as Burbank, Colton, Inyokern, Ontario, Oxnard, Palmdale, Palm Springs, Santa Ana (Orange County Airport), Santa Barbara and Santa Maria as well as to Lake Havasu City in Arizona.  Cable Commuter was acquired by Golden West Airlines, another southern California based commuter air carrier.

Today
KCCB is a Class G (untowered) airport. Runway 1-19 is no longer in existence. In its place are some hangars, a fuel island, and a covered, lighted wash rack.

There is a terminal building with an FBO (flight school and rentals), aircraft repair shop, Maniac Mike's restaurant, and a control tower which is used to marshal aircraft during the annual Cable Air Show in January. (The tower is not normally used at any other time, as Cable is an uncontrolled airport.)

This airport is also home to the Civil Air Patrol Squadron 25. Cable Airport is still owned by the Cable family. Based on number of aircraft based at the field (450), it ranks as the largest privately owned airport in the world.

Facilities and aircraft 

For the 12-month period ending August 31, 2016, the airport had 92,189 general aviation aircraft operations, an average of 252 per day. There were 227 aircraft based at this airport: 94% single-engine, <1% multi-engine, <1% helicopter, <1% glider and <1% ultralight.

Accidents and incidents 
 June 24, 2006: A Cessna 560 Citation Encore operated by Aero Charter Services en route from San Diego to Cable Airport approached runway 24 around 10:00 pm, overran the runway. and came to a hold about 850 feet beyond the runway threshold. The accident left one dead and two seriously injured.
 May 6, 2016: After an unsuccessful attempt to restart their engines and approaching San Bernardino, an Antonov An-2R en route from Cable Airport to San Bernardino made a forced landing in a residential area which left none injured. According to the subsequent investigation, the lower gascolator and the fine fuel filter were filled partially with water which led to engine failure.
 September 17, 2018: A Piper PA-24 Comanche en route from Reno, Nevada to Cable Airport landed short of the runway and left two uninjured.  The incident was reportedly caused by engine failure.
 January 3, 2022: A Cessna 120 crashed during a go-around attempt after encountering the wake turbulence of a low-flying helicopter operating at the airport. The aircraft entered an uncommanded right bank and impacted the surface of the airport upside down. The sole pilot onboard survived with minor injuries.

References

External links 
Cable Airport (official site)

Upland, California
Airports in San Bernardino County, California